C. Dale Brittain is an American author and professor of medieval history. As well as writing historical works, she is the author of fantasy novels.

Biography
Brittain's best-known novel is A Bad Spell in Yurt, the first of the Royal Wizard of Yurt series. The series continues with The Wood Nymph and the Cranky Saint, Mage Quest, The Witch and the Cathedral, Daughter of Magic, and Is This Apocalypse Necessary? The first five books, published by Baen Books, are currently out of print but are available as e-books and audiobooks. The last book in the series, published by The Wooster Book Company, remains in print.

Brittain has published three novellas in the Yurt series, The Lost Girls and the Kobold, Below the Wizards' Tower and A Long Way 'Til November. These are available exclusively as Kindle books. She has also written the first book of a new Yurt series, The Starlight Raven, about a girl who wants to be the first female wizard. The other two books, Voima and Count Scar, stand alone in their respective universes.

Brittain is married to Robert A. Bouchard, a molecular biologist.

Bibliography
A Bad Spell in Yurt, . Cover by Tom Kidd. First printing August 1991; second printing February 1993; third printing May 1995.
The Wood Nymph and the Cranky Saint, . Cover by Dean Morrissey. First printing February 1993. 
Mage Quest, . Cover by Laurence Schwinger. First printing May 1993.
Voima, . Cover by Gary Ruddell. First printing January 1995.
The Witch and the Cathedral, . Cover by Newel Convers and Courtney Skinner. First printing April 1995. 
Daughter of Magic, . Cover by Darrell K. Sweet. First printing May 1996.
Count Scar (with Robert A. Bouchard), . Cover by Darrell K. Sweet. First printing September 1997.
Is This Apocalypse Necessary? . Cover by Matthias Grünewald. First printing September 2000.
The Lost Girls and the Kobold, novella, Kindle, December 10, 2013
Below the Wizards' Tower, novella, Kindle, August 31, 2014
The Starlight Raven, Kindle, April 4, 2015
A Long Way 'Til November, novella, Kindle, September 5, 2015
Third Time's a Charm, novella omnibus, Kindle, November 17, 2015

References

External links
Official website

1948 births
Living people
21st-century American historians
21st-century American male writers
20th-century American women writers
21st-century American women writers
20th-century American novelists
21st-century American novelists
American women novelists
American fantasy writers
Women science fiction and fantasy writers
20th-century American non-fiction writers
21st-century American non-fiction writers
American women historians
American male non-fiction writers
20th-century American male writers